Ronald Davis Bitton (February 22, 1930 – April 13, 2007) was a charter member and president of the Mormon History Association, professor of history at the University of Utah, and official Assistant Church Historian in the Church of Jesus Christ of Latter-day Saints (LDS Church) working with Leonard J. Arrington.

Biography
Bitton was raised in the area of Blackfoot, Idaho. He started playing piano at age six and was a talented pianist. After two years at Brigham Young University (BYU), he served as an LDS missionary in France where he edited the church's L'Etoile periodical. While on his LDS mission he performed on the piano to assist in proselyting. He then served in the United States Army during the Korean War. Bitton returned to BYU where he was president of his Phi Alpha Theta chapter. While president of the Phi Alpha Theta chapter at BYU he invited Arrington to address the spring banquet. Arrington also wrote a letter of recommendation for Bitton during this time. He graduated in 1956 from BYU with a BA in history. Afterward, he studied at Princeton University; there he received a M.A. in 1958 and earned his Ph.D. in French History in 1961.

Bitton was a professor of history at the University of Texas at Austin until 1961 when he started teaching at the University of California, Santa Barbara. He then joined the University of Utah faculty in 1966 where he taught for 29 years until his retirement in 1995. Coming out of retirement, from 2005–2006 Bitton was a visiting professor at Brigham Young University Hawaii.

He was an original member and founder of the Mormon History Association in 1965 and he served as president from 1971–1972. Bitton served as an official Assistant Church Historian to Leonard J. Arrington from 1972–1982. Bitton referred to this time as "Camelot", an exciting time of unprecedented development of new Mormon historical research. Bitton published several works with Arrington. With Arrington's help, Bitton was appointed as a consultant for BYU to the newly created Joseph Fielding Smith Institute with an honorarium of $1,000 per year. However, this position only lasted two years before it was terminated.

Bitton married his wife Joan in 1984, and later in life they served together as guides on Temple Square for five years. He died at the age of 77 in Salt Lake City.

Awards and honors
Davis Bitton has been presented five awards by the MHA. His first award granted by the MHA was in 1975 for the Best Article By A Senior Author for his works Ritualization of Mormon History and The Making of a Community: Blackfoot, Idaho, 1878 to 1910. Two years later he won the Outstanding Bibliography Award for his Guide to Mormon Diaries and Autobiographies. In 1979, Arrington and Bitton were given the MHA Best Book Award for The Mormon Experience: A History of the Latterday Saints. For his biography on George Q. Cannon, Bitton was honored with the MHA Best Book Award in 1999; in 2006, the Mormon History Association awarded Bitton the Leonard J. Arrington Award for "distinguished and meritorious service to Mormon history."

Although his specialty was French history, Bitton made many contributions to Mormon history. Bitton was given the "Silver Award" from Dialogue: A Journal of Mormon Thought for an essay on B. H. Roberts. Bitton's biography of George Q. Cannon was described by Deseret News "as a definitive study of one of the most important of all Mormon leaders."

Published works
The following is only a partial list of Bitton's published works:

Books

Winner of Outstanding Bibliography Award (Mormon History Association)
Winner of Best Book Award (Mormon History Association)

Winner of Best Book Award (Mormon History Association) and Evans Biography Award (Utah State University)

Articles
Winner of Best Article by a Senior Author (Mormon History Association)

Notes

References

External links
 Davis Bitton papers, MSS 7441 at L. Tom Perry Special Collections, Harold B. Lee Library, Brigham Young University
  Archive link
 Davis Bitton at the MLCA Database
 Talk given by James B. Allen at Bitton's funeral: Davis Bitton: His Scholarship and Faith

1930 births
2007 deaths
20th-century American historians
American male non-fiction writers
20th-century Mormon missionaries
United States Army personnel of the Korean War
American Latter Day Saint writers
American Mormon missionaries in France
Brigham Young University alumni
Brigham Young University–Hawaii faculty
Historians of France
Official historians of the Church of Jesus Christ of Latter-day Saints
People from Blackfoot, Idaho
Princeton University alumni
University of California, Santa Barbara faculty
University of Texas at Austin faculty
University of Utah faculty
Writers from Utah
Burials at Salt Lake City Cemetery
Latter Day Saints from Idaho
Latter Day Saints from New Jersey
Latter Day Saints from Texas
Latter Day Saints from California
Latter Day Saints from Utah
Harold B. Lee Library-related 20th century articles
20th-century American male writers